George Wolfe (9 October 1878–1958) was an English footballer who played in the Football League for Nottingham Forest and Woolwich Arsenal.

References

1878 births
1958 deaths
English footballers
Association football defenders
English Football League players
Folkestone F.C. players
Arsenal F.C. players
Swindon Town F.C. players
Nottingham Forest F.C. players